Tongzhou District, formerly known as Tongzhou City (1993-2009) or Nantong County (1912-1993), is one of three urban districts of Nantong, Jiangsu province, China. It was a county-level city under the administration of Nantong until July 2009, when it became a district of Nantong.  As of 2010, Tongzhou had a population of 1,246,400.

History
The district takes its name from its former position as the capital of Tongzhou, a prefecture of imperial China. Under the southern Song dynasty, the city controlled not just its adjacent lands but also Xisha and Dongsha, the Yangtze River shoals that eventually developed into Chongming Island.

Shigang Town is located beside the Yangtze where residents made a living mainly by salt making and fishing in ancient times. In 860, Yuhuangdian was built and, six year later, the palace of Emperor Taizong of the Tang was rebuilt as the Guangyuan Temple. From the Song to the Qing dynasties, many temples were built in Shigang.

Administrative divisions
In the present, Tongzhou District has 19 towns. 
19 towns

Climate

Local specialities
 Xiting Crackers
 BBoss Beer
 Mahogany Carvings
 Zhengchang Bacon
 Xinzhong Fermented bean curd

Transport
Nantong West railway station

References

External links
 "Illustrated Album of Yangzhou Prefecture", from 1573 to 1620, has illustrations of Tongzhou

County-level divisions of Jiangsu
Nantong